Novy Uoyan (Shene Uoian) is an urban locality (an urban-type settlement) in Severo-Baykalsky District of the Republic of Buryatia, Russia, located in the basin of the Upper Angara River,  from Ulan-Ude, the capital of the republic. As of the 2010 Census, its population was 3,963.

History

It was founded in the mid-1970s in conjunction with the construction of the Baikal–Amur Mainline (BAM), near the settlement of Uoyan on the left bank of the Upper Angara. The railway station and the settlement were constructed by workers from the then Latvian SSR, as sections of the track were given patronage of Komsomol brigades from various parts of the Soviet Union. Urban-type settlement status was granted to it in 1976.

Regular traffic on the railway section between Severobaykalsk and Novaya Chara in northern Zabaykalsky Krai began in 1989. Completion of the BAM did not, however, bring the expected economic development, and with the economic crisis in the late 1980s, the population almost halved between 1989 and 2002.

Administrative and municipal status
Within the framework of administrative divisions, the urban-type settlement (inhabited locality) of Novy Uoyan is incorporated within Severo-Baykalsky District as Novy Uoyan Urban-Type Settlement (an administrative division of the district). As a municipal division, Novy Uoyan Urban-Type Settlement is incorporated within Severo-Baykalsky Municipal District as Novy Uoyan Urban Settlement.

Economy
Novy Uoyan is an important station on the Baikal–Amur Mainline, which presents the only real economic activity. The BAM crosses the Upper Angara close to the settlement via a  bridge.

There are proposals to build a  connection between the BAM and the Trans-Siberian Railway through Buryatia, with a northern terminus at Novy Uoyan, beginning either at Novoilyinsky, or from Mogzon in Zabaykalsky Krai. This section would be mainly intended to service mining developments, such as the lead and zinc Ozyorninskoye mine, which could be reached from the south by 2012.

References

Sources

Urban-type settlements in Buryatia
Populated places in Severo-Baykalsky District
1970s establishments in the Soviet Union